The Southern Railway (SR) gave the designation 5-BEL to the five-car all-Pullman electric multiple units which worked the prestigious Brighton Belle trains between London Victoria and Brighton. These units survived long enough in British Rail ownership to be allocated TOPS Class 403. Between 1933 and 1935 the units were designated 5-PUL (the 'PUL' code was then used for the 6-PUL units).

Construction
The SR electrified the London Victoria to Brighton line in the early 1930s, and full electric services commenced over the route from 1 January 1933. For the high-profile Southern Belle Pullman train three five-car units, consisting entirely of Pullman cars, were built. All 15 cars were built by Metropolitan Cammell. In June 1934 the Southern Railway renamed the Southern Belle as the Brighton Belle.

As they were Pullman cars, owned by the independent Pullman Car Company (UK), the individual carriages were numbered in its series, taking numbers 279 to 293, and the first class cars were given women's names while the third (from June 1956, second) class cars carried less-inspiring Car No xx designations, derived from the second and third digits of the Pullman Car Company's number.

Formations
Three different car types were built - Driving Motor Brake Parlour Third (DMBPT), Trailer Parlour First with Kitchen (TPFK), and Trailer Parlour Third (TPT). Initial formations of these units were as follows:

Withdrawal and preservation
The last Brighton Belle train ran on 30 April 1972, and the three 5BEL units were withdrawn. However all 15 cars were sold into private ownership, though no unit was kept together as a single entity. Instead they were split up and each vehicle was initially used as an individual Pullman car, the majority not in railway use. A number have been returned to service on the main line with the Belmond British Pullman (previously the Venice Simplon Orient Express or VSOE), as hauled cars forming part of the British Pullman charter train. A campaign to return the Brighton Belle to mainline service was launched by the 5BEL Trust  in 2008. By  2009, the trust had assembled a four-car set, having acquired cars from the North Norfolk Railway and VSOE. A fifth car, No.282 'Doris', was acquired from the Bluebell Railway in 2011 and a sixth, No.279 'Hazel' in 2012. After restoration, the Brighton Belle is expected to enter testing in Autumn/Winter 2018.

The table below sets out the current position:

References

5BEL
403
Metropolitan Cammell multiple units
Pullman Car Company (UK)
Train-related introductions in 1932
750 V DC multiple units